Makarovsky is a rural locality (a khutor) in Rossoshinskoye Rural Settlement, Uryupinsky District, Volgograd Oblast, Russia. The population was 4 as of 2010.

Geography 
Makarovsky is located in steppe, 37 km southwest of Uryupinsk (the district's administrative centre) by road. Bryansky is the nearest rural locality.

References 

Rural localities in Uryupinsky District